Mount Zion United Methodist Church is a historic church at 218 Alexander Street in Belton, Texas.

It was built in 1893 and added to the National Register of Historic Places in 1990.

See also

National Register of Historic Places listings in Bell County, Texas

References

https://atlas.thc.state.tx.us/NR/pdfs/90001872/90001872.pdf

United Methodist churches in Texas
Churches on the National Register of Historic Places in Texas
Gothic Revival church buildings in Texas
Churches completed in 1893
19th-century Methodist church buildings in the United States
Churches in Bell County, Texas
National Register of Historic Places in Bell County, Texas